My Life on Ice is a 2002 French teen drama film directed by Olivier Ducastel and Jacques Martineau, which tracks a year in the life of a teenage figure skater in a quasi-documentary, video diary style.

Plot
The film centers on Étienne, who lives in Rouen with his mother and grandmother and intends to take part in the national figure skating championship. For his 16th birthday, his grandmother gives him a digital camcorder as a present, which he starts to use immediately (supplying the introductory scenes of the film).

Étienne films anything and everything around him – his family, his teacher Laurent, Ludovic, his best friend, himself figure skating, the sea, steep cliffs. As for Ludovic and his geography teacher, it soon becomes apparent that his obsession with them is grounded in more than just artistic pursuits. Étienne's homosexuality becomes more and more clear both to him and the audience over the course of the film.

Even though Étienne is determined to make this year "the year of love", the year when everything turns around for him, things do not go as well as anticipated. He makes a blunder in his figure skating performance and only achieves second place. And when he starts, very carefully, to talk to Ludovic about the possibility of two men being in love, Ludovic runs away.

In the final minutes of the film, the purpose of Étienne's video diary gets clear: Feeling he has failed in what he set out to do and being deeply hurt by Ludovic's resentment, Étienne decides to jump from the cliff and leave the camcorder (which he sets up to film his suicide) behind to explain to his family what he went through.

Luckily, a stranger walks by at that moment and notices the boy close to the cliff and his camera nearby. The final scene shows the stranger and Étienne in bed after sex, with Étienne seeming truly happy for the first time.

Cast
 Jimmy Tavares as Étienne
 Ariane Ascaride as Caroline, Étienne's mother
 Jonathan Zaccaï as Laurent, Étienne's teacher and his mother's boyfriend
  as Étienne's grandmother
 Lucas Bonnifait as Ludovic, Étienne's best friend
 Hanako Bron as Vanessa, Ludovic's girlfriend
 Frédéric Gorny as the young man at the cliff

References

External links
 

2002 films
2000s coming-of-age drama films
2002 LGBT-related films
2000s sports drama films
2000s teen drama films
Figure skating films
Films directed by Jacques Martineau
Films directed by Olivier Ducastel
Films set in Normandy
Films shot in Normandy
French coming-of-age drama films
French LGBT-related films
French sports drama films
French teen drama films
Gay-related films
LGBT-related coming-of-age films
LGBT-related sports drama films
Rouen
Teen LGBT-related films
Teen sports films
2002 drama films
2000s French films